Pyke is a surname, and may refer to

Fictional characters
George Alexander Pyke, Lord Tilbury, character devised by PG Wodehouse
Pyke, The Bloodharbor Ripper from League of Legends

Real people
Don Pyke (born 1968), Australian rules footballer
Geoffrey Pyke (1893–1948), English journalist, spy and inventor
Helen Pyke, English pianist and composer
Hy Pyke (1935–2006), American character actor
Frank Pyke (1941–2011), Australian footballer, sports scientist and sports administrator
James Pyke (cricketer) (born 1966), Australian sportsman
James Pyke (rugby union) (1866–1941), English rugby union footballer
Josh Pyke (born 1983), Australian singer-songwriter-musician
Lionel Edward Pyke (1854–1899), English barrister
Magnus Pyke (1908–1992), British scientist and media personality
Margaret Pyke (1893–1966), campaigner for family planning
Mike Pyke (born 1984), Canadian player of rugby and Australian rules football
Stuart Pyke, British sports journalist and broadcaster
Veronica Pyke (born 1981), Australian cricketer

Other
 Pyke, one of the Iron Islands in the George R. R. Martin A Song of Ice and Fire series.  The seat of House Greyjoy. Also the surname of noble bastards born in the islands.

See also

 Pike (disambiguation)